Moses Brown (1738–1836) was an American abolitionist and industrialist.

Moses Brown may also refer to:
Moses Brown (basketball) (born 1999), American basketball player
Moses Browne (1704–1787), English poet and clergyman
Moses Brown House, house in Maryland, US
Moses Brown School, a school in Rhode Island, US

Brown, Moses